The 1916 Chinese vice presidential by-election were a by-election held on 30 October 1916 in Beijing for the Vice President of China due to the vacancy left by incumbent Li Yuanhong as he replaced Yuan Shikai as president after Yuan's sudden death. Feng Guozhang of the Zhili clique won over Lu Rongting of the Old Guangxi Clique in the election.

Results

See also
 History of Republic of China
 Vice President of the Republic of China
 1912 Chinese National Assembly election

References
 中央選舉委員會，中華民國選舉史，台北：中央選舉委員會印行，1987年

Presidential elections in the Republic of China (1912–1949)
1916 in China
China
Vice presidential elections
October 1916 events